IFK Mariehamn is a Finnish football club based in Mariehamn, the capital of the Åland Islands. It plays in the Finnish Premier Division (Veikkausliiga). The club is managed by Daniel Norrmén, and it plays its home matches at Wiklöf Holding Arena.

History
While IFK Mariehamn was formed in 1919, the sports club did not have a football department until the mid-1930s. Initially the team participated primarily in local tournaments on Åland, only sporadically playing other Finnish or Swedish teams. The team has participated in the Finnish football leagues since 1945.

Until the 1970s, IFK Mariehamn played primarily in the Finnish football divisions 3 and 4. The club reached a peak in 1975 and 1976, when the club first advanced to division 2 and then reached division 1 (Ykkönen) the following year. After two seasons in division 1, IFK Mariehamn was relegated to division 2, where it would remain up until the 2000s, except for a few seasons in division 3 during the early 1990s.

In 2003, IFK Mariehamn returned to division 1. After only one season in division 1, the club advanced, for the first time in its history to the premier division of Finnish football, the Veikkausliiga, for the 2005 season following qualifying the October 2004 games against FC Jazz. In its first season in the Veikkausliiga, IFK Mariehamn finished 12th out of 14 teams. In 2006, the club finished in 5th place and the year after 6th after an impressive run of unbeaten matches during the autumn of 2007.

In addition to playing in the Veikkausliiga, IFK Mariehamn participates in local Åland tournaments, having won the Åland cup 40 times and the Åland football championships 42 times. In recent years, the club has been the most dominant football team on Åland, having in 2008 won its 11th and 15th straight titles in these two events, respectively.

In 2009, IFK Mariehamn started its first season as a fully professional football club. In 2015, the team won the Finnish Cup for the first time.

On 23 October 2016, IFK Mariehamn defeated FC Ilves 2-1 to secure the first ever Veikkausliiga Championship for the island club.

Domestic history
 1945–1971: Divisions 3 and 4 (two seasons)
 1972: Division 2
 1973–1975: Division 3
 1976: Division 2
 1977–1978: Division 1
 1979–1990: Division 2
 1991–1992: Division 3
 1993–2003: Division 2
 2004: Division 1
 2005–present: Veikkausliiga (Premier Division)

16 seasons in Veikkausliiga
4 season in Ykkönen
41 seasons in Kakkonen
13 seasons in Kolmonen

European history

Notes
 1QR: First qualifying round
 2QR: Second qualifying round

Current squad

Out on loan

Youth players

International players 
This is a list of former and current players who have played at full international level while with the club. They are ordered by nationality.

  Estonia
 2017 Andreas Vaikla

  Finland
 2010 Petteri Forsell
 2011 Kristian Kojola
 2013 Albin Granlund
 2023 Elmo Henriksson

  Jamaica
 2013 Dever Orgill

  Kenya
 2007 Willis Ochieng
 2007 Amos Ekhalie

  New Zealand
 2013 Kris Bright

  Philippines
 2018 Amin Nazari

  Sierra Leone
 2006 Samuel Barlay

  Zambia
 2007 Clive Hachilensa

Management and boardroom

Management
As of 20 January 2021

Boardroom
As of 11 April 2017

Honours
Veikkausliiga
Champions: 2016
Finnish Cup
Winners: 2015

MIFK Ishockey 
MIFK Ishockey is the ice hockey section of IFK Mariehamn. MIFK men's team plays in the Swedish "HockeyFyran", the fifth division of Swedish hockey. MIFK Ishockey has also played in the Finnish III-divisioona.

IFK Mariehamn plays its home games in the Islandia ice rink in Mariehamn. Islandia's capacity is 800. The hockey team was founded in 1993.

MIFK won their division in HockeyFyran with 33 points and advanced to the HockeyTrean qualifiers for the 2023/24 season. MIFK's head coach is Kenneth Westerback, assistant coaches are Kim Schauman and Robert Andersson, the GM is André Portin and the team captain is Pontus Nylén.

IFK Mariehamn U17 plays in the Finnish U17 II-divisioona.

MIFK Ishockey Dam is the women's ice hockey team founded in 2017. The team plays in the Swedish Division 2, but has played in the Finnish Suomi-sarja.

References

External links
 Official website
 GMM – The fan club

 
Football clubs in Finland
Association football clubs established in 1919
Football in Åland
Mariehamn
1919 establishments in Finland
Ice hockey teams in Finland
Ice hockey in Finland